The second  season of Dancing Brasil premiered on Monday, July 24, 2017 at 10:30 p.m. (BRT / AMT) on RecordTV.

On September 25, 2017, TV host Yudi Tamashiro & Bárbara Guerra won the competition with 80.70% of the public vote over actress Suzana Alves & Tutu Morasi (10.02%) and singer Lexa & Lucas Teodoro (9.28%).

Cast

Couples

Scoring chart

Key
 
 
  Eliminated
  Risk zone
  Withdrew
  Third place
  Runner-up
  Winner

Weekly scores
Individual judges' scores in the charts below (given in parentheses) are listed in this order from left to right: Jaime Arôxa, Fernanda Chamma, Paulo Goulart Filho

Week 1: First Dances 
The couples performed the cha-cha-cha, foxtrot, rumba or salsa.
Running order

Week 2: Free Theme 
The couples performed one unlearned dance. Jive and quickstep are introduced.

Running order

Week 3: Musical Icons 
The couples performed one unlearned dance to songs by musical icons. Waltz is introduced.

Running order

Week 4: Oscars Night 
The couples performed one unlearned dance to famous film songs that either won or were nominated on the Best Original Song category at The Oscars. Pasodoble is introduced.

Since Théo Becker suffered an ankle injury during week 3's performance, he and Sarah were unable to rehearse and also perform on this week's live show. As result, the couple was given a bye for the week.

Running order

Week 5: The Musicals 
The couples performed one unlearned musical theatre-inspired dance. Tango is introduced.

Théo Becker was again unable to rehearse and perform on this week's live show, which, according to the show's rules, meant he would have to withdraw from the competition.

Running order

Week 6: Circus Night 
The couples performed one unlearned dance inspired by a Modern circus show.

Since Alinne Rosa injured her foot and Carla Prata stretched a muscle during week 6's rehearsals, both were unable to perform on this week's live show. As result, both celebrities and their partners were given a bye for the week.

The three-way tie between Lexa & Teo, Milene & Rafael and Suzana & Tutu at the top of the leaderboard sent all couples to the Risk zone. However, due to the unexpected injuries earlier in the week, the public vote was voided and all couples advanced directly to week 7.

Running order

Week 7: Latin Night 
The couples performed one unlearned Latin-inspired dance routine.

Running order

Week 8: Brazil Night 

The couples performed one unlearned dance to classic Brazilian songs.

Running order

Midway through the show, the six couples participated in dance-offs designed and coached by one of the three judges, with the winners receiving three points to be added to their total scores. Zouk, jazz and contemporary are introduced.

Week 9: Semifinals 

The couples performed their final two unlearned dances.

Running order

Week 10: Finals 
The couples performed a redemption dance and a showdance that fused three previously learned dance styles.

Running order

Dance chart 
 Week 1: One unlearned dance (First Dances)
 Week 2: One unlearned dance (Free Theme)
 Week 3: One unlearned dance (Musical Icons)
 Week 4: One unlearned dance (Oscars Night)
 Week 5: One unlearned dance (The Musicals)
 Week 6: One unlearned dance (Circus Night)
 Week 7: One unlearned dance (Latin Night)
 Week 8: One unlearned dance & dance-off challenge (Brazil Night)
 Week 9: Two unlearned dances (Semifinals)
 Week 10: Redemption dance & showdance (Finals)

Ratings and reception

Brazilian ratings
All numbers are in points and provided by Kantar Ibope Media.

References

External links 

 Dancing Brasil on R7.com

2017 Brazilian television seasons